This lists the singles that reached number one on the Spanish Promusicae sales and airplay charts in 2014. Total sales correspond to the data sent by regular contributors to sales volumes and by digital distributors.

Chart history

References

Spain
 Number-one singles
2014